Michael Mugo Githae is a Kenyan marathon winner, who won bronze at the 2022 Commonwealth Games in Birmingham, England. Githae's medal was the first medal won by Kenya at the games.

References

External links 

1994 births
Living people
Athletes (track and field) at the 2022 Commonwealth Games
Commonwealth Games bronze medallists for Kenya
Kenyan male marathon runners
Commonwealth Games medallists in athletics
Medallists at the 2022 Commonwealth Games